The Nadaburg Unified School District is the K-12 school district in the town of Wittmann, Arizona. It operates two elementary schools: Nadaburg Elementary (the historical school in the town), as well as Desert Oasis Elementary inside Surprise city limits. The district opened its first high school, called Mountainside High School, in 2020, although classes are currently being taught in one of the buildings at Nadaburg School. Prior to this, Nadaburg students attended Wickenburg High School in that town, just up US 60.

As a unified school district in Arizona, the Nadaburg district has the authority to operate its own high school. A district must be considered "unified" to serve both K-8 and high school students, as demonstrated by the need for the J.O. Combs Unified School District to actually hold a unification vote before beginning to build its own high school.

On November 5, 2019, Nadaburg residents voted in favor of passing a bond that would go towards construction of a new high school. Ninth grade students will begin taking classes in the fall of 2020 in the existing Nadaburg School building, followed by tenth graders in the fall of 2021. Nadaburg was originally planning to open a high school by 2010, and then 2013.

References

External links 
 

School districts in Maricopa County, Arizona